The 1st Central Committee of the Indochinese Communist Party was in session from 1935 to 1951.

Plenums
The Central Committee (CC) is not a permanent institution. Instead, it convenes plenary sessions between party congresses. When the CC is not in session, decision-making powers are delegated to its internal bodies; that is, the Politburo and the Secretariat. None of these organs are permanent bodies either; typically, they convene several times a month.

Composition

Members

Alternates

References

Bibliography

 

1st Central Committee of the Indochinese Communist Party
1935 in Vietnam
1951 in Vietnam